The Barnsley East by-election was held on 12 December 1996, following the death of the Labour Party Member of Parliament Terry Patchett for Barnsley East, in South Yorkshire, England, on 11 October.

Barnsley council leader Jeff Ennis held the seat for Labour on an increased majority of 68% and more than three quarters of the votes, despite a low voter turnout. Despite a slight reduction in the vote for the Liberal Democrats, they overtook the Conservative Party for second place.

The Socialist Labour Party, on their leader Arthur Scargill's home territory, was able to save its deposit.

With the election of a new Labour MP, the Conservatives lost their Parliamentary majority.

References

Barnsley East by-election
Barnsley East by-election
By-elections to the Parliament of the United Kingdom in South Yorkshire constituencies
Elections in Barnsley
1990s in South Yorkshire
Barnsley East by-election